Symphyotrichum fontinale is a species of flowering plant in the family Asteraceae endemic to Florida and a small area of southwest Georgia. Commonly known as Florida water aster and Florida water American-aster, it is a perennial, herbaceous plant that may reach  in height.

Distribution and habitat

Conservation
NatureServe lists it as Vulnerable (G3) worldwide.

Citations

References

fontinale
Endemic flora of Florida
Plants described in 1933
Taxa named by Edward Johnston Alexander